In computing and telecommunication, an escape character is a character that invokes an alternative interpretation on the following characters in a character sequence. An escape character is a particular case of metacharacters. Generally, the judgement of whether something is an escape character or not depends on the context.

In the telecommunications field, escape characters are used to indicate that the following characters are encoded differently. This is used to alter control characters that would otherwise be noticed and acted on by the underlying telecommunications hardware. In this context, the use of escape characters is often referred to as quoting.

Definition
An escape character may not have its own meaning, so all escape sequences are of two or more characters.

Escape characters are part of the syntax for many programming languages, data formats, and communication protocols. For a given alphabet an escape character's purpose is to start character sequences (so named escape sequences), which have to be interpreted differently from the same characters occurring without the prefixed escape character.

The functions of escape sequences include:

 To encode a syntactic entity, such as device commands or special data, which cannot be directly represented by the alphabet.
 To represent characters, referred to as character quoting, which cannot be typed in the current context, or would have an undesired interpretation. In this case, an escape sequence is a digraph consisting of an escape character itself and a "quoted" character.

Control character
Generally, an escape character is not a particular case of (device) control characters, nor vice versa. If we define control characters as non-graphic, or as having a special meaning for an output device (e.g. printer or text terminal) then any escape character for this device is a control one. But escape characters used in programming (such as the backslash, "\") are graphic, hence are not control characters. Conversely most (but not all) of the ASCII "control characters" have some control function in isolation, therefore they are not escape characters.

In many programming languages, an escape character also forms some escape sequences which are referred to as control characters.

Examples

JavaScript 
  single quote
  double quote
  backslash
  new line
  carriage return
  tab
  backspace
  form feed
  vertical tab (Internet Explorer 9 and older treats  as  instead of a vertical tab.
  null character (U+0000 NULL) (only if the next character is not a decimal digit; else it is an octal escape sequence)
  character represented by the hexadecimal byte "FF"

Example code:console.log("Using \\n \nWill shift the characters after \\n one row down")
console.log("Using \\t \twill shift the characters after \\t one tab length to the right")
console.log("Using \\r \rWill imitate a carriage return, which means shifting to the start of the row") // can be used to clear the screen on some terminals. Windows uses \r\n instead of \n alone

ASCII escape character
Typically, the escape character was sent first in such a sequence to alert the device that the following characters were to be interpreted as a control sequence rather than as plain characters, then one or more characters would follow to specify some detailed action, after which the device would go back to interpreting characters normally. This was later developed to ANSI escape codes covered by the ANSI X3.64 standard. The escape character also starts each command sequence in the Hewlett Packard Printer Command Language.

An early reference to the term "escape character" is found in Bob Bemer's IBM technical publications, who is credited with inventing this mechanism during his work on the ASCII character set.

The Escape key is usually found on standard PC keyboards. However, it is commonly absent from keyboards for PDAs and other devices not designed primarily for ASCII communications. The DEC VT220 series was one of the few popular keyboards that did not have a dedicated Esc key, instead of using one of the keys above the main keypad. In user interfaces of the 1970s–1980s it was not uncommon to use this key as an escape character, but in modern desktop computers, such use is dropped. Sometimes the key was identified with AltMode (for alternative mode). Even with no dedicated key, the escape character code could be generated by typing  while simultaneously holding down .

Programming and data formats
Many modern programming languages specify the double-quote character as a delimiter for a string literal. The backslash escape character typically provides two ways to include double-quotes inside a string literal, either by modifying the meaning of the double-quote character embedded in the string ( becomes ), or by modifying the meaning of a sequence of characters including the hexadecimal value of a double-quote character ( becomes ).

C, C++, Java, and Ruby all allow exactly the same two backslash escape styles. The PostScript language and Microsoft Rich Text Format also use backslash escapes. The quoted-printable encoding uses the equals sign as an escape character.

URL and URI use %-escapes to quote characters with a special meaning, as for non-ASCII characters. The ampersand character may be considered as an escape character in SGML and derived formats such as HTML and XML.

Some programming languages also provide other ways to represent special characters in literals, without requiring an escape character (see e.g. delimiter collision).

Communication protocols
The Point-to-Point Protocol (PPP) uses the  octet as an escape character. The octet immediately following should be XORed by  before being passed to a higher level protocol. This is applied to both  itself and the control character  (which is used in PPP to mark the beginning and end of a frame) when those octets need to be transmitted by a higher level protocol encapsulated by PPP, as well as other octets negotiated when the link is established.

Bourne shell
In Bourne shell (sh), the asterisk and question mark characters are wildcard characters expanded via globbing. Without a preceding escape character, an  will expand to the names of all files in the working directory that do not start with a period if and only if there are such files, otherwise  remains unexpanded. So to refer to a file literally called "*", the shell must be told not to interpret it in this way, by preceding it with a backslash. This modifies the interpretation of the asterisk. Compare:

Windows Command Prompt
The DOS command-line interpreter, though it has similar syntax, does not support this.

For example, on the Windows Command Prompt, this will result in a syntax error.
C:\>echo <hello world>
The syntax of the command is incorrect.whereas this will output the string: 
C:\>echo ^<hello world^>
<hello world>

Windows PowerShell
In Windows, the backslash is used as a path separator; therefore, it generally cannot be used as an escape character. PowerShell uses backtick ( ` ) instead.

For example, the following command:
PS C:\> echo "`tFirst line`nNew line"
        First line
New line

Others
 Quoted-printable, which encodes 8-bit data into 7-bit data of limited line lengths, uses the equals sign as an escape character.

See also 
 AltGr key used to type characters that are unusual for the locale of the keyboard layout.
 Escape sequences in C
 Leaning toothpick syndrome
 Nested quotation
 Stropping (syntax) – in some conventions a leading character (such as an apostrophe) functions as an escape character

References

External links
That Powerful ESCAPE Character -- Key and Sequences  – Bob Bemer

Pattern matching
Control characters